Sorokinella is a genus of fungi in the family Dermateaceae. The genus contains 2 species.

The genus was circumscribed by Jane Fröhlich and Kevin D. Hyde in Fungal Diversity Res. Ser.3 on page 122 in 2000.

The genus name of Sorokinella is in honour of Nikolai Vasilevich Sorokin (1846–1909), who was a Russian botanist, Mycologist, Microbiologist  and Parasitologist. He was Professor of Botany and Director of the Botanical Garden of the Kazan Federal University.

Species
As accepted by Species Fungorum;
 Sorokinella appendicospora 
 Sorokinella calami

See also
 List of Dermateaceae genera

References

External links
Sorokinella at Index Fungorum

Dermateaceae genera